3rd Iranian Majlis was commenced on 6 December 1914 and ended on 13 November 1915.

Fraction members
Neutrality was in coalition with the Moderates.

References

3rd term of the Iranian Majlis